The 1938 Combined Scottish Universities by-election was a by-election held from 21 to 25 February 1938 for the Combined Scottish Universities, a university constituency of the British House of Commons.

Vacancy 
The seat had become vacant when the National Labour Member of Parliament (MP) (and former Prime Minister), Ramsay MacDonald had died on 9 November 1937, aged 71. He had held the seat since the by-election in 1936, having held several other seats since he was first elected to Parliament at the 1906 general election.

Candidates 
The parties in the National Government did not usually stand candidates against each other, and since in this case the seat was held by National Labour, there was no Unionist of National Liberal candidate.

The National Government supported a "National" candidate Sir John Anderson, a former civil servant who had been Governor of Bengal from 1932 to 1937.

The Scottish National Party candidate was Andrew Dewar Gibb, the Regius Professor of Law at Glasgow University who had also contested the by-election in 1936. Two other candidates stood as independents.

Result 
The result was a victory for Anderson (the National candidate), won nearly 50% of the votes, the remainder being quite evenly between the other candidates. He held the seat until the university constituencies were abolished for the 1950 general election.

Votes

See also
Combined Scottish Universities (UK Parliament constituency)
1927 Combined Scottish Universities by-election
1934 Combined Scottish Universities by-election
1935 Combined Scottish Universities by-election
1936 Combined Scottish Universities by-election
1945 Combined Scottish Universities by-election
1946 Combined Scottish Universities by-election
List of United Kingdom by-elections (1931–1950)

References

Sources 

1938 in Scotland
1930s elections in Scotland
1938 elections in the United Kingdom
By-elections to the Parliament of the United Kingdom in the Combined Scottish Universities
Higher education in Scotland